Sphaerodactylus inaguae,  also known as the Inagua sphaero or Inagua least gecko, is a species of lizard in the family Sphaerodactylidae . It is endemic to Great Inagua in the Bahamas.

References

Sphaerodactylus
Reptiles of the Bahamas
Endemic fauna of the Bahamas
Reptiles described in 1932